The Battle of Reynogüelén may refer to:

 Battle of Reynogüelén (1536) between Spaniards and Mapuches during the expedition to Chile of the conqueror Diego de Almagro.
 Battle of Reynogüelén (1565) between Spaniards and Mapuches during the Arauco War.